Sovereign of the Seas may refer to one of these ships:

 , an English Royal Navy warship of 102 guns; later renamed Sovereign and Royal Sovereign
 Sovereign of the Seas (clipper), an 1852 clipper ship built by Donald McKay in Boston
  (formerly MS Sovereign of the Seas), the world's largest cruise ship when launched in 1988 for Royal Caribbean International

See also
 Sovereign (ship)
 Sovereign (disambiguation)
 Royal Sovereign (disambiguation)

Ship names